Events from the year 1686 in France.

Incumbents 
Monarch: Louis XIV

Events
 
 
 
 
 
 July – The League of Augsburg is founded in response to claims made by Louis XIV of France on the Electorate of the Palatinate in western Germany. It comprises the Holy Roman Empire, the Netherlands, Sweden, Spain and the electors of Bavaria, Saxony and the Electorate of the Palatinate.
 The Café Procope, which remains in business in the 21st century, is opened in Paris by Procopio Cutò as a coffeehouse.

Births
 

 
 6 July – Antoine de Jussieu, French naturalist (d. 1758)

Deaths
 

 31 January – Jean Mairet, French dramatist (b. 1604)
 11 November - Louis II de Bourbon, Prince de Condé, French general (b. 1621)

See also

References

1680s in France